Marko Albert (born 25 June 1979) is a former Estonian triathlete. Albert started his sporting career as swimmer and switched to triathlon in 1997. He is coached by Jüri Käen.

Achievements
Albert has twice finished second in International Triathlon Union World Cup: Rio de Janeiro in 2004 and New Plymouth in 2006. He has also been total six times in TOP 10 in ITU World Cup. He competed in two Olympic Games triathlons 2004 Athens 21st place and 2008 Beijing 41st place. 
Latest best result is 2014 Ironman New Zealand where he got first place in front of Cameron Brown and Terenzo Bozzone. He has also won Ironman 70.3 Racine and Ironman 70.3 Victoria. His best Ironman time is 8:04:08. Marko is one of the best swimmers in long course triathlon.

Albert is also an experienced triathlon coach holding 5th category coach qualification.

Notable results
Some of Albert's notable achievements include:

References

External links

ITU profile for Marko Albert

1979 births
Living people
Estonian male triathletes
Olympic triathletes of Estonia
Triathletes at the 2004 Summer Olympics
Triathletes at the 2008 Summer Olympics
Sportspeople from Tallinn